The East 63rd branch, formerly known as the Jackson Park branch, is a  long branch of the Chicago "L" operated as part the Green Line by the Chicago Transit Authority, serving the Woodlawn neighborhood of Chicago, Illinois.

History
The first station on the East 63rd branch, 61st Street, opened January 22, 1893. Service was extended to Madison Avenue (later renamed Dorchester) on April 23, 1893, and to Jackson Park on May 12, 1893, to serve the World's Columbian Exposition, which was held in Jackson Park. On October 31, 1893, the World's Columbian Exposition ended and the Jackson Park station was closed. Stony Island was then made the terminus and was renamed Jackson Park.

On March 4, 1982, structural defects in the Jackson Park branch's bridge over the Illinois Central Railroad forced its closure south of the 61st street stop.  When the branch reopened on December 12, 1982, service was only restored as far as the University stop.  On January 9, 1994, the Green Line closed for renovation. When the line reopened on May 12, 1996, the Cottage Grove stop was the new terminal, and the Jackson Park branch was renamed the East 63rd branch. On September 27, 1997, the portion of the branch east of Cottage Grove was demolished with less than 24 hours public notice.

Station listing

References

Chicago Transit Authority
Railway lines in Chicago
Railway lines opened in 1893